Tanasije Kuvalja (born 24 July 1946) is a Yugoslav former cyclist. He competed in the individual road race and the team time trial events at the 1968 Summer Olympics.

References

External links
 

1946 births
Living people
People from Brus
Serbian male cyclists
Yugoslav male cyclists
Olympic cyclists of Yugoslavia
Cyclists at the 1968 Summer Olympics